Fred J Benge was an association football player who represented New Zealand at international level.

Benge played three official A-international matches for New Zealand in 1954, all against trans-Tasman neighbours Australia, the first a 2–1 win on 14 August, followed by consecutive 1–4 losses  on 28 August and 4 September respectively. Including unofficial matches Benge played 14 games for New Zealand between 1954 and 1957.

References

Year of birth missing
Year of death missing
New Zealand association footballers
New Zealand international footballers
Stop Out players
Association footballers not categorized by position